Leslie Malerich (born 29 February 1980) is an Italian-American former collegiate and Olympic softball pitcher and coach originally from Merrillville, Indiana. She attended and played for the Florida State Seminoles from 1999 to 2002 and is the school's career leader in innings pitched in the Atlantic Coast Conference, where she was named the 2001 player of the year. She also competed for Italy in the 2004 Summer Olympics.

FSU Seminoles
Malerich was named a three-time All-Conference 2000-02. She was named Player of The Year in 2001 and earned National Fastpitch Coaches Association Third Team All-American. Malerich led the Seminoles to the 2002 Women's College World Series and pitched her last game on May 26, 2002, tossing 5 innings with 5 strikeouts in a loss to the Arizona Wildcats.

Statistics

FSU Seminoles

References

1980 births
Living people
Florida State Seminoles softball players
Softball players from Indiana
Italian softball players
Olympic softball players of Italy
Softball players at the 2004 Summer Olympics